The Northeastern Conference (NEC) is a high school athletic conference in District A of the Massachusetts Interscholastic Athletic Association.

Schools 
In 2019, teams from Everett, Malden, Medford, Revere, and Somerville, left the NEC to rejoin the Greater Boston League (GBL). Revere's football team is scheduled to remain in the NEC until 2020.

Masconomet Regional High School joined the NEC in the fall of 2020. The following twelve schools are a member of the Northeastern Conference.

References 

 
Massachusetts Interscholastic Athletic Association leagues